John Alfred Sines (August 13, 1914 – April 16, 1978) was an American professional basketball player as well as head coach at the high school and college levels. After his collegiate career at Purdue University, Sines played for the Indianapolis Kautskys in the National Basketball League for several seasons and averaged 7.2 points per game.

Sines served in the Navy during World War II. A couple years later he began coaching, with his first job being the head coach for Lawrence University from 1946 to 1951, compiling an overall record of 47–42. He then moved on to the University of Tennessee from 1951 to 1959 as an assistant coach. When then-head coach Emmett Lowery moved on, Sines was promoted to be the Volunteers' new head coach. He spent three seasons leading the team, compiling only a 26–45 overall record in that span. He resigned in 1962 after two players were caught being involved in a gambling scandal.

Sines moved to Palmetto, Florida and coached Palmetto High School's basketball team for one season (1963–64) before being hired by Manatee Community College. At Manatee, he coached from 1964 to 1977 before retiring.

Head coaching record

College

References

1914 births
1978 deaths
American men's basketball coaches
American men's basketball players
United States Navy personnel of World War II
Basketball coaches from Indiana
Basketball players from Indiana
Forwards (basketball)
High school basketball coaches in the United States
Indianapolis Kautskys players
Junior college men's basketball coaches in the United States
Lawrence Vikings football coaches
Lawrence Vikings men's basketball coaches
People from Carroll County, Indiana
Purdue Boilermakers men's basketball players
Sportspeople from Lafayette, Indiana
Tennessee Volunteers basketball coaches